USS Effective (AM-92) was an  of the United States Navy. Laid down on 9 February 1942 by the Dravo Corporation, Neville Island, Pittsburgh, Pennsylvania, launched on 12 June 1942, and commissioned on 1 October 1942. The ship was reclassified as a submarine chaser, PC-1596 on 1 June 1944.

World War II Atlantic Operations 
Effective sailed from New Orleans, Louisiana, on 11 November 1942, and called at Key West, Florida, and Charleston, South Carolina, before arriving at Norfolk, Virginia, 8 January 1943. After intensive training, she arrived in Bermuda in February. She remained there on patrol and local escort, with occasional escort voyages to ports on the east coast, until 7 July 1944. Sailing from Bermuda she rendezvoused with a convoy bound for the Mediterranean.

As submarine chaser PC-1596  
On 15 August 1944 PC-1596 saw action in the invasion of southern France. She continued to support the operation by escorting convoys among various  Mediterranean ports, training and patrol. She departed Oran 27 May 1945 for the east coast and arrived at Jacksonville, Florida, in June.

She was decommissioned on 9 November 1945 at Jacksonville, Florida, transferred to the Maritime Commission for disposal on 30 July 1946, and sold to Mechanical Equipment, New Orleans, Louisiana. Fate unknown.

PC-1596 received one battle star for World War II service.

References

External links
 

 

Adroit-class minesweepers
Ships built in Pittsburgh
1942 ships
World War II minesweepers of the United States
World War II patrol vessels of the United States